Radan Lenc (born July 30, 1991) is a Czech professional ice hockey player. He currently plays for HV71 in the Swedish Hockey League (SHL). 

During his second season in the SHL with Frölunda HC in the 2022–23 campaign, Lenc registered 2 goals and 5 points through 16 regular season games before leaving the club to join fellow SHL outfit, HV71, on a two-year contract on 2 November 2022.

Career statistics

Regular season and playoffs

International

References

External links

1991 births
Living people
Amur Khabarovsk players
HC Bílí Tygři Liberec players
BK Mladá Boleslav players
Czech ice hockey forwards
Frölunda HC players
HV71 players
Sportspeople from Mladá Boleslav
Ice hockey players at the 2022 Winter Olympics
Olympic ice hockey players of the Czech Republic
Czech expatriate ice hockey players in Sweden
Czech expatriate ice hockey players in Russia